Baqla Kesh (also Romanized as Bāqlā Kesh; also known as Bāqālākesh) is a village in Hend Khaleh Rural District, Tulem District, Sowme'eh Sara County, Gilan Province, Iran. At the 2006 census, its population was 257, in 63 families.

References 

Populated places in Sowme'eh Sara County